Thomas Dibdin may refer to:

Thomas Frognall Dibdin (1776–1847), English bibliographer
Thomas John Dibdin (1771–1841), English dramatist and songwriter
Thomas Colman Dibdin (1810–1893), English water colour artist and teacher